Sebgag is a town and commune in Laghouat Province, Algeria. According to the 1998 census it has a population of 6,107.

References

Communes of Laghouat Province
Cities in Algeria
Algeria